Kristen Elizabeth Babb-Sprague (born July 29, 1968) is an American former synchronized swimmer.

Babb-Sprague was awarded a gold medal in the women's solo event at the 1992 Summer Olympics after a scoring scandal. In the technical figures routine, a Brazilian judge accidentally entered a score of 8.7 instead of 9.7 for the Canadian swimmer Sylvie Fréchette, allowing Babb-Sprague to win the competition. Fréchette's medal was afterwards upgraded to gold by the International Swimming Federation, but Babb-Sprague was allowed to retain hers.

Babb-Sprague is married to former Major League Baseball player Ed Sprague.

See also
 List of members of the International Swimming Hall of Fame

References

1968 births
American synchronized swimmers
Living people
Olympic gold medalists for the United States in synchronized swimming
Olympic medalists in synchronized swimming
Sportspeople from Walnut Creek, California
Synchronized swimmers at the 1992 Summer Olympics
World Aquatics Championships medalists in synchronised swimming
Synchronized swimmers at the 1991 World Aquatics Championships

Medalists at the 1992 Summer Olympics
20th-century American women